Kanmani Unakkaga is a 1999 Tamil-language film, directed by the duo Ravi-Raja. The film stars Ishaq Hussaini and Suvaluxmi, while Senthil and Jennifer portrayed supporting roles. The music for the film was composed by Pradeep Raviand the film opened to positive reviews in November 1999.

Cast
Ishaq Hussaini as Rishi
Suvaluxmi as Sudha
Anandaraj as Pratap
Mansoor Ali Khan as Karan
Senthil as Kandha
Baby Jennifer as Kanmani
Ponnambalam
Vadivukkarasi
Loose Mohan
Vichithra

Production
Ishaq Hussaini appeared in a series of films in the late 1990s and early 2000s, often scripting and producing his own films. After getting an average response to Jayam (1999), he reunited with the same director duo, Ravi-Raja, to make the family drama film, Kanmani Unakkaga.

Release
The film was censored with a UA certificate, with two cuts. Critic Malathi Rangarajan of The Hindu wrote "Beginning the film with a bang is appreciable but the challenge lies in keeping the interest of the viewer sustained - and when scenes are protracted beyond a point they could tire the audience. Kanmani Unakkaga does." A critic from ChennaiOnline.com wrote "The script loses direction in the second half. A lot of sentiment is thrown in, too many villains crop up, and somewhere along the way the audience loses interest."

Soundtrack
Music was composed by Pradeep Ravi.
"Chinna Ponnu"
"En Swasa Kaatre"
"Nee Mazhalai"
"Vazhiyae Oru"
"Ya Ya Pakkam Vaya"

References

1999 films
1990s Tamil-language films